Names of Jerusalem refers to the multiple names by which the city of Jerusalem has been known and the etymology of the word in different languages. According to the Jewish Midrash, "Jerusalem has 70 names". Lists have been compiled of 72 different Hebrew names for Jerusalem in Jewish scripture.

Today, Jerusalem is called Yerushalayim and Al-Quds. The city is also known especially among religious-minded Muslims as Bayt al-Maqdis, referring to the Temple in Jerusalem, called Beit HaMikdash in Hebrew.

Early extra-biblical and biblical names

Jerusalem

A city called Ꜣwšꜣmm in the Execration texts of the Middle Kingdom of Egypt (c. 19th century BCE) and typically reconstructed as (U)Rušalim is usually identified as Jerusalem. Alternatively, the name may be etymologised as r'š (head) + rmm (exalted), meaning 'the exalted head', and not referring to Jerusalem.

Jerusalem is called either 

The Sumero-Akkadian name for Jerusalem, uru-salim, is variously etymologised to mean "foundation of [or: by] the god Shalim": from West Semitic yrw, ‘to found, to lay a cornerstone’, and Shalim, the Canaanite god of the setting sun and the nether world, as well as of health and perfection.

Jerusalem is the name most commonly used in the Bible, and the name used by most of the Western World. In Arabic, this name occurs in the form Ūrsālim which is the Arabic name promoted by the Israeli government.

The name "Shalem", whether as a town or a deity, is derived from the same root Š-L-M as the word "shalom", meaning peace, so that the common interpretation of the name is now "The City of Peace" or  "Abode of Peace".

The ending -ayim indicates the dual in Hebrew, thus leading to the suggestion that the name refers to the two hills on which the city sits. However, the pronunciation of the last syllable as -ayim appears to be a late development, which had not yet appeared at the time of the Septuagint. In fact, in the unvocalized Masoretic Text of the Hebrew Bible the yod that would be required for the -ayim ending (so that it would be written , as in post-biblical Hebrew, rather than ) is almost always absent. It is only the much later vocalization, with the vowel marks for a and i squeezed together between the lamed and the mem, that provides the basis for this reading. In extra-biblical inscriptions, the earliest known example of the -ayim ending was discovered on a column about 3 km west of ancient Jerusalem, dated to the first century BCE.

In Genesis Rabbah 56:10, the name is interpreted as a combination of yir'eh, "He will see [to it]," and Shalem, the city of King Melchizedek (based on Genesis 14:18). A similar theory is offered by Philo in his discussion of the term "God's city." Other midrashim say that Jerusalem means "City of Peace".

In Greek, the city is called either Ierousalēm (Ἰερουσαλήμ) or Hierosolyma (Ἱεροσόλυμα). The latter exhibits yet another re-etymologization, by association with the word hieros ("holy"). In early Greek manuscripts,  is presented as a "holy name":  .

Shalem
The name Shalem/Salem (שלם šālêm) is found in the account of Melchizedek in : And Melchizedek king of Salem brought forth bread and wine: and he was the priest of the most high God (El Elyon).

That the name Salem refers to Jerusalem is evidenced by Psalm 76:2 which uses "Salem" as a parallel for "Zion", the citadel of Jerusalem. The same identification is made by Josephus and the Aramaic translations of the Bible.

Shalem was the Canaanite god of dusk, sunset, and the end of the day, also spelled Shalim. Many scholars believe that his name is preserved in the name of the city Jerusalem. It is believed by some scholars that the name of Jerusalem comes from Uru + Shalem, meaning the foundation of Shalem or founded by Shalem or city of Shalem, and that Shalem was the city god of the place before El Elyon.

Zion

Mount Zion ( Har Tsiyyon) was originally the name of the hill where the Jebusite fortress stood, but the name was later applied to the Temple Mount just to the north of the fortress, also known as Mount Moriah, possibly also referred to as "Daughter of Zion" (i.e., as a protrusion of Mount Zion proper).

From the Second Temple era, the name came to be applied to a hill just to the south-west of the walled city. This latter hill is still known as Mount Zion today. From the point of view of the Babylonian exile (6th century BCE), Zion has come to be used as a synonym of the city of Jerusalem as a whole.

Other biblical names
Mount Moriah (now usually identified with the Temple Mount) was a part of Jebus, a city inhabited by the Jebusites. According to the Bible, this land was sold to King David by Ornan the Jebusite for six hundred shekels of gold (1Chr 21:26) in order to build in the threshing floor an altar for sacrifice to stop the plague God had sent upon Israel. Solomon later built the Temple there. The Jebusite stronghold at that time was called Zion which David took by force, and it afterward began to be called The City of David.
 Biblical Hebrew מוריה
 Biblical Greek Μώριας Mōrias
 Biblical Latin Moria
 Arabic مُـرِيَّـا (Muriyyā) or مُـرَيَّـا (Murayyā) (?)
 Hebrew מוֹרִיָּה Môriyyāh
City of David: The City of David (Hebrew Ir David  עיר דוד  Tiberian Hebrew עִיר דָּוִד ʿîr Dāwiḏ) is the biblical term for the Iron Age walled fortress; now the name of the corresponding archaeological site just south of the Temple Mount
Jebus (Jebusite city) in 
The Lord sees, Hebrew Adonai-jireh, in Vulgate Latin Dominus videt. In the opinion of some Rabbinic commentators, the combination of Yir'eh (יראה) with Shalem (שלם) is the origin of the name Jerusalem (ירושלם).
Oasis of Justice, Hebrew Neveh Tzedek (נווה צדק), Tiberian Hebrew נְוֵה-צֶדֶק Nəwēh Ṣeḏeq.
Ariel (אֲרִיאֵל) in Isaiah 29:1-8
City of the Holy Place/Holiness, Hebrew Ir Ha-Kodesh / Ir Ha-Kedosha, (עיר הקודש) in Isa 48:42, Isa 51:1, Dan 9:24 Neh 11:1 and Neh 11:18.
City of the Great King
 Tiberian Hebrew קִרְיַת מֶלֶךְ רָב

Middle Persian
According to "Shahnameh", ancient Iranian used "Kangdezh Hûkht" کَـنْـگ دِژ هُـوْخْـت or "Dezhkang Hûkht" دِژ کَـنْـگ هُـوْخْـت to name Jerusalem. "Kang Diz Huxt" means "holy palace" and was the capital of "Zahhak" and also "Fereydun's" kingdom.
 Another variant of the name is Kang-e Dozhhûkht (Dozhhûkht-Kang), which is attested in Shahnameh. It means "[the] accursed Kang".

Greco-Roman
Aelia Capitolina was the Roman name given to Jerusalem in the 2nd century, after the destruction of the Second Temple. The name refers to Hadrian's family, the gens Aelia, and to the hill temple of Jupiter built on the remains of the Temple.
During the later Roman Era, the city was expanded to the area now known as the Old City of Jerusalem. Population increased during this period, peaking at several hundred thousand, numbers only reached again in the modern city, in the 1960s.

From this name derive Arabic  ʼĪlyāʼ, Tiberian Hebrew  ʼÊliyyāh Qappîṭôlînāh, Standard Hebrew  Eliyya Qappitolina.
The Roman name was loaned into Arabic as ʼĪlyāʼ, early in the Middle Ages, and appears in some Hadith (Bukhari 1:6, 4:191; Muwatta 20:26), like Bayt ul-Maqdis.

Islamic
Jerusalem fell to the Muslim conquest of Palestine in 638.
The medieval city corresponded to what is now known as the Old City (rebuilt in the 2nd century as Roman Aelia Capitolina). The population at the time of the Muslim conquest was about 200,000, but from about the 10th century it declined, to less than half that number by the time of the Christian conquest in the 11th century, and with the re-conquest by the Khwarezmi Turks was further decimated to about 2,000 people (moderately recovering to some 8,000 under Ottoman rule by the 19th century).

The modern Arabic name of Jerusalem is اَلْـقُـدْس al-Quds, and its first recorded use can be traced to the 9th century CE, two hundred years after the Muslim conquest of the city. Prior to the use of this name, the names used for Jerusalem were إِيْـلْـيَـاء Iliya (from the Latin name Aelia) and بَـيْـت الْـمَـقْـدِس (Bayt al-Maqdis) or بَـيْـت الْـمُـقَـدَّس (Bayt al-Muqaddas).

Although is commonly believed, Jerusalem is not mentioned in the Quran by its name. There are some Muslim clerics who locate 'Al-Aqsa' in Saudi Arabia.

Al-Quds is the most common Arabic name for Jerusalem and is used by many cultures influenced by Islam. The name may have been a direct translation of the Hebrew nickname for the city, "Ir HaKodesh" (עיר הקודש "The Holy City" or "City of the Holiness"). The variant اَلْـقُـدْس الـشَّـرِيْـف al-Quds aš-Šarīf ("Al-Quds the Noble") has also been used, notably by the Ottomans, who also used the Persian influenced Kuds-i Şerîf.
 Azerbaijani – Yerusəlim, Qüds, or Qüdsi-Şərif
 Kurdish – / Orşelîm or /Quds, 
 Persian – , Qods
 Standard Hebrew – , HaKodesh
 Tiberian Hebrew – , HaQodhesh  "The Holy"
 Turkish – Kudüs or Yeruşalim

Bayt al-Maqdis or Bayt al-Muqaddas is a less commonly used Arabic name for Jerusalem though it appeared more commonly in early Islamic sources. It is the base from which nisbas (names based on the origin of the person named) are formed – hence the famous medieval geographer called both al-Maqdisi and al-Muqaddasi ( 946) This name is of a semantic extension from the Hadiths used in reference to the Temple in Jerusalem, called Beit HaMikdash (בית המקדש "The Holy Temple" or "Temple of the Sanctified Place") in Hebrew.

 Avar – Байтул Макъдис, Baytul Maqdis
 Azerbaijani – Beytül-Müqəddəs
 Indonesian – Baitulmaqdis
 Kurdish – / Beytî Muqeddes 
 Malay – Baitulmuqaddis
 Persian – , Beit-e Moghaddas
 Turkish Beyt-i Mukaddes
 Urdu – , Bait-ul-Muqaddas

 al-Balāṭ is a rare poetic name for Jerusalem in Arabic, loaned from the Latin palatium "palace". Also from Latin is إِيْـلْـيَـاء ʼĪlyāʼ, a rare name for Jerusalem  used in early times Middle Ages, as in some Hadith (Bukhari 1:6, 4:191; Muwatta 20:26).

Sign languages 

Jewish and Arab signers of Israeli Sign Language use different signs: the former mimic kissing the Western Wall, the latter gesture to indicate the shape of the Masjid Al-Aqsa (i.e. the Dome of the Rock).

See also
Names of the Levant
Shaam
Timeline of the name "Palestine"

References

Bibliography

External links
 

Jerusalem

History of Jerusalem
Culture of Jerusalem
Jerusalem